Bob Willis was a right-arm fast bowler, who represented the England cricket team in 90 Tests between 1971 and 1984. In cricket, a five-wicket haul (also known as a "five-for" or "fifer") refers to a bowler taking five or more wickets in a single innings. In Test cricket, Willis took 325 wickets, including 16 five-wicket hauls. The Wisden Cricketers' Almanack named him one of their cricketers of the year in 1978, and termed him "one of the world's foremost fast bowlers."

Willis made his Test debut during the fourth Test of the 1970–71 Ashes series, against Australia at the Sydney Cricket Ground. His first Test five-wicket haul came in the third Test of the 1974–75 Ashes series at the Melbourne Cricket Ground. Willis' career-best figures for an innings were 8 wickets for 43 runs—seventh among Top 100 Bowling performances of all time by Wisden—at Headingley, during the 1981 Ashes series. He never took ten wickets in a match; his best performance for a match was 9 wickets for 92 runs against New Zealand in 1983 at Headingley. He was most successful against Australia, taking seven five-wicket hauls.

Willis made his One Day International (ODI) debut against the West Indies at Headingley, during the 1973 Prudential Trophy. He never took a five-wicket haul in ODIs; his career-best figures for an innings were 4 wickets for 11 runs against Canada during the 1979 Cricket World Cup, a match England won by 8 wickets at Old Trafford. , Willis is thirty-ninth overall among all-time combined five-wicket haul takers.

Key

Test five-wicket hauls

Notes

References

External links
 

Lists of English cricket records and statistics
Willis, Bob